The 1986 Lower Hutt mayoral election was part of the New Zealand local elections held that same year. The elections were held for the role of Mayor of Lower Hutt plus other local government positions including sixteen city councillors, also elected triennially. The polling was conducted using the standard first-past-the-post electoral method.

Background
The incumbent Mayor, Sir John Kennedy-Good, retired leaving an open race. The United Citizens' chose former councillor Glen Evans over sitting councillor Gerald Bond to replace Kennedy-Good to lead the ticket. This caused a rift and Bond split from the United Citizens' to form his own Combined Progressive ticket. Labour's candidate from the previous election, councillor Alister Abernethy, contested the mayoralty again. The United Citizens won in a landslide with majority of councillors and Evans winning the mayoralty against Abernethy in second. Bond came a distant third for mayor and lost his council and energy board seat. All of his ticket (which included several incumbents) were defeated. Evans was expecting a closer result and had thought Bond would be a close second.

Mayoral results

Councillor results

Notes

References

Mayoral elections in Lower Hutt
1986 elections in New Zealand
Politics of the Wellington Region